
Gmina Koźmin Wielkopolski is an urban-rural gmina (administrative district) in Krotoszyn County, Greater Poland Voivodeship, in west-central Poland.

Villages
Apart from the town of Koźmin Wielkopolski, Gmina Koźmin Wielkopolski contains the villages and settlements of Biały Dwór, Borzęcice, Borzęciczki, Cegielnia, Czarny Sad, Dębiogóra, Dębówiec, Dymacz, Gałązki, Góreczki, Gościejew, Józefów, Kaniew, Klatka, Lipowiec, Mogiłka, Mokronos, Mycielin, Nowa Obra, Orla, Orlinka, Paniwola, Pogorzałki Małe, Pogorzałki Wielkie, Psie Pole, Sapieżyn, Serafinów, Skałów, Staniew, Stara Obra, Suśnia, Szymanów, Tatary, Walerianów, Wałków, Wrotków and Wyrębin.

Neighbouring gminas
Gmina Koźmin Wielkopolski is bordered by the gminas of Borek Wielkopolski, Dobrzyca, Jaraczewo, Jarocin, Kobylin, Krotoszyn, Pogorzela and Rozdrażew.

References
Polish official population figures 2006

Kozmin Wielkopolski
Krotoszyn County